Viktoriya Kazakevich (born 12 May 1998) is a Belarusian footballer who plays as a defender for Belarusian Premier League club FC Minsk and the Belarus women's national team.

Career
Kazakevich has been capped for the Belarus national team, appearing for the team during the 2019 FIFA Women's World Cup qualifying cycle.

References

External links
 
 
 

1998 births
Living people
Women's association football defenders
Belarusian women's footballers
Footballers from Minsk
Belarus women's international footballers